USS Galaxy may refer to:

 , a motorboat used for research by the Navy, 1941–1945
 , a fictional starship in the Star Trek universe

United States Navy ship names